Laleh Mehree Bakhtiar (born Mary Nell Bakhtiar; July 29, 1938 – October 18, 2020) was an Iranian-American Islamic and Sufi scholar, author, translator, and psychologist. She produced a gender-neutral translation, The Sublime Quran, and challenged the status quo on the Arabic word daraba, traditionally translated as "beat" — a word that she said has been used as justification of abuse of Muslim women.

Early life 
Born Mary Nell Bakhtiar to an American mother and Iranian father in Tehran, Bakhtiar grew up alongside two older sisters with her mother in Los Angeles and Washington, D.C., as a Christian. In Washington, she became a Catholic at age eight. Her mother, however, was an Idaho Presbyterian. Bakhtiar received her BA in History from Chatham College, graduating in 1960. While visiting her mother Helen in Isfahan, Bakhtiar was unhappy with being Mary Nell. Helen suggested to her friend and Bakhtiari tribal chief Yahya Khan, who gave Bakhtiar the Persian name "Laleh" in 1957. She then went by it professionally. Earlier, in Cambridge, Massachusetts, at the age of 19, she met the Iranian philosopher Seyyed Hossein Nasr who encouraged her to pursue Islam personally and academically. Bakhtiar by then was "a Christian without any particular denomination" after drifting away from Catholicism. When she was 26 she moved to Iran to study Sufism and Quranic Arabic at the University of Tehran under Nasr, who continued to mentor Bakhtiar for 30 years.

Career 
Bakhtiar wrote or translated over 150 books on Islam, including The Sense of Unity with Nader Ardalan, The Sublime Quran, and Sufi Expressions of the Mystic Quest. She was also president of the Institute of Traditional Psychology and a Scholar-in-Residence at Kazi Publications.

The Sublime Quran 
Her translation of the Quran, The Sublime Quran, was published in 2007. Bakhtiar's translation attempts to take a female perspective, and to admit alternative meanings to Arabic terms that are ambiguous or the subject of scholarly debate. For example, she translates kāfirūn as "those who are unthankful", rather than the common translations of "unbelievers" or "infidels". In Chapter 4, Verse 34, concerning how husbands should treat rebellious wives, she translates the Arabic word daraba as "go away", rather than "beat" or "hit". Bakhtiar believed these translations would foster understanding between non-Muslims and Muslims.

Personal life 
Bakhtiar married her Iranian husband, architect Nader Ardalan, in 1960, while she was a nondenominational Christian; she eventually converted to Islam in 1964. She eventually divorced Ardalan in 1976 and returned to the U.S. in 1988, where she received her Ph.D. from the University of New Mexico in educational psychology. She moved to Chicago in 1992, and was a Nationally Certified Counselor. She died on October 18, 2020, in Chicago from myelodysplastic syndrome.

Family 
Bakhtiar had three children, Mani Helene (Farhadi), Iran Davar, and Karim Ardalan. She had eight grandchildren. Bakhtiar's daughter Iran Davar is an author, journalist, and the founder of IVOW, a start-up partnering with the Institute of Traditional Psychoethics and Guidance to develop a conversational AI based on Bakhtiar's written records.

Bakhtiar's mother, Helen Jeffreys Bakhtiar, was a public health worker in Iran during the 1950s, and was honored by the nomadic Bakhtiari tribe, who named a mountain after her.

Her older brother was Jamshid Bakhtiar, better known as Jim, a psychiatrist. He was a fullback and placekicker at the University of Virginia and he was selected by the Football Writers Association of America as a first-team back on its 1957 College Football All-America Team.

Awards and recognition 
In May 2016, Bakhtiar was awarded the Lifetime Achievement Award from the Mohammed Webb Foundation in Chicago.

On November 15, 2020, Daisy Khan, founder of WISE, honored Bakhtiar with a Lifetime Achievement Award.

Criticism 
Mohammad Ashraf, head of the Islamic Society of North America (Canada), said he would not permit The Sublime Quran to be sold in the society's bookstore of ISNA because Bakhtiar had not studied at an accredited Muslim institution. "This woman-friendly translation will be out of line and will not fly too far", he commented. "Women have been given a very good place in Islam."

Khaled Abou El Fadl, Islamic law professor from University of California, Los Angeles (UCLA), said she "has a reputation as an editor, not [as] an Islamic scholar", and that three years of Classical Arabic were not enough. El Fadl also "is troubled by a method of translating that relies on dictionaries and other English translations." Bakhtiar disagreed with such criticism saying, "The criticism is [there] because I'm a woman." She also said that some other well-known translators were not considered Islamic scholars.

Legacy 
In December 2009, American novelist Dave Eggers recommended The Sublime Quran on Oprah.com. Eggers said, "[I]t opened me up to the beauty of the faith in a way that no interpretation of the text had before. And, of course, in the book you find, very clearly, Islam's dedication to social justice, to peace and to the less fortunate."

Jordanian Prince Ghazi Bin Muhammad approved of Bakhtiar's interpretation of the Quran. Author Reza Aslan has also praised the translation, saying, "For the first time a woman has been able to reengage the scripture from a different point of view, thus producing a gender neutral translation that is far more consistent with the message and spirit of the Quran than any previous translation."

Scott Alexander, Catholic-Muslim Studies Chair at the Catholic Theological Union, stated, "her contributions to the study of Islam in the West have been in a stunning array of different of capacities and have resulted in a legacy that is truly monumental. As an author, Dr. Bakhtiar has written a number of books that stand as landmarks in the writings of Sufi masters and especially Sufi women in the late twentieth and early twenty-first / early fifteenth centuries."

Shaida Khan, Executive Director of the Domestic Harmony Foundation, a non-profit organization working against domestic violence within Muslim, Middle Eastern and South Asian communities, stated, "...as a female scholar, she is considered a knowledgeable and meritorious persona in the annals of Islamic literature. She is an exemplary individual particularly for women who have been victimized by domestic violence, and also for all Muslim women to look up to."

Ingrid Mattson, former president of the Islamic Society of North America, and Professor of Islamic Studies at Hartford Seminary, reflecting on Bakhtiar's life's work, said, "What could be more welcome than an examination of the life of a Muslim woman who is neither a silent victim of oppression, waiting to be saved by a secular revolution, nor an apologist for misguided ideology, but an intelligent woman of faith and integrity? Laleh Bakhtiar has lived a remarkable life - but a life with which we can relate, because while some of her experiences appear exotic to the typical American, her values and principles are not."

Marcia Hermansen, Director of the Islamic World Studies Program and Professor in the Theology Department at Loyola University Chicago, said, "One of things that strikes me about the [Sublime Quran] translation is how its reception in the "mainstream" Muslim community—at least in North America, made it less acceptable or even unacceptable for Muslim community leaders to simply repeat misogynistic interpretations."

References

External links

Laleh Knowledge Lake Conversational AI based on Bakhtiar's work

1938 births
2020 deaths
Translators of the Quran into English
American expatriates in Iran
American scholars of Islam
American translators
American women psychologists
American writers of Iranian descent
American Sufis
Bakhtiari people
Chatham University alumni
Converts to Shia Islam from Christianity
Deaths from cancer in Illinois
Deaths from myelodysplastic syndrome
Iranian emigrants to the United States
Lur people
Writers from Tehran
Faculty of Letters and Humanities of the University of Tehran alumni
Women scholars of Islam
Female Shia scholars of Islam
Proponents of Islamic feminism
Scholars of Sufism
Sufi writers
University of New Mexico alumni
Former Roman Catholics
Traditionalist School
21st-century American women